White Rose is an oil field development project  off the coast of Newfoundland. Husky Energy is the operator and 72.5 per cent interest holder in the White  Rose oil fields.

Discovered in 1984, the White Rose offshore oil field is located in the Jeanne d'Arc Basin 350 kilometres east of St. John's, Newfoundland and Labrador, Canada. The field consists of both oil and gas pools, including the South White Rose oil pool. White Rose is the second harsh environment development in North America to use a Floating Production Storage and Offloading (FPSO) vessel, SeaRose. Production from the field began on November 12, 2005.

The working interest partners are:

White Rose
 Cenovus Energy (60%) -  operator
 Suncor Energy (40%)

West White Rose
 Cenovus Energy (56.375%) -  operator
 Suncor Energy (38.625%)
 Natlor Energy (5%)

External links
 Husky Energy: White Rose
 Ship Technology: SeaRose
 Offshore Technology: White Rose
 Map of Canadian Oil and gas infrastructure

Oil fields of Newfoundland and Labrador
Husky Energy subsidiaries